The minister of justice and attorney general of Canada is a dual-role portfolio in the Canadian Cabinet. 

The officeholder in the role of Minister of Justice serves as the minister of the Crown responsible for the Department of Justice and the justice portfolio, and in the role of Attorney General, litigates on behalf of the Crown and serves as the chief legal advisor to the Government of Canada. (Though most prosecution functions of the attorney general have been assigned to the Public Prosecution Service of Canada. The attorney general is supported in this role by the director of public prosecutions.)

Attorney General of Canada

The role was created in 1867 to replace the attorney general of Canada West and attorney general of Canada East.

As the top prosecuting officer in Canada, 'attorney general' is a separate title held by the minister of justice—a member of the Cabinet. The minister of justice is concerned with questions of policy and their relationship to the justice system. In their role as attorney general, they are the chief law officer of the Crown. The roles have been connected since confederation. As a result of controversy, following the SNC-Lavalin affair, Anne McLellan was appointed to review the roles and prepare a report on whether they should be separated. She recommended the positions remain combined.

This cabinet position is usually reserved for someone holding a legal qualification. There have been exceptions: Joe Clark only studied the first year of law at Dalhousie University before transferring to University of British Columbia Faculty of Law and dropping out to embark on political life.

This cabinet portfolio has been held by many individuals who went on to become prime minister including John Sparrow David Thompson, R. B. Bennett, Louis St Laurent, Pierre Elliott Trudeau, John Turner, Kim Campbell and Jean Chrétien (Clark became MoJAG after his time as prime minister). This is the only Canadian Ministry (other than that of the prime minister) which has not been reorganized since its creation in 1867.

A separate cabinet position, the minister of public safety (formerly known as the "solicitor general") administers the law enforcement agencies (police, prisons, and security) of the federal government.

Ministers of justice and attorneys general 
Key:

See also 
Alberta Minister of Justice and Attorney General
Attorney General of British Columbia
Minister of Justice and Attorney General (Manitoba)
Office of the Attorney General (New Brunswick)
Minister of Justice and Public Safety and Attorney General of Newfoundland and Labrador
Minister of Justice of the Northwest Territories
Attorney General and Minister of Justice of Nova Scotia
Minister of Justice of Nunavut
Attorney General of Ontario
Minister of Justice and Public Safety and Attorney General of Prince Edward Island
Ministry of Justice (Quebec) (also as attorney general)
Minister of Justice and Attorney General of Saskatchewan
Minister of Justice (Yukon)
Named Persons v. Attorney General of Canada

 Historical roles
 Attorney General of Upper Canada
 Attorney General of Lower Canada

References

Justice
Canada
Attorneys General of Canada